Richi may refer to:
Richi, Iran, a village in Fars Province, Iran
Richi Lake, Belarus, Latvia
Ricardo Pérez de Zabalza Goytre (born 1977), Spanish former football winger
Richi Puspita Dili (born 1989), Indonesian badminton player
Richi Solaiman, Bangladeshi actress